Edgar is a census-designated place and unincorporated community in Carbon County, Montana, United States. As of the 2010 census it had a population of 114. Edgar has a post office with a ZIP code 59026. The post office was established May 28, 1909 with John J. Thornton as its first postmaster. Thornton named the town after his brother.

Edgar lies east of the intersection of U.S. Route 310 and Elwell Street. Edgar is south of Rockvale and northeast of Fromberg. Edgar is a small, agricultural community with a number of silos and elevators. It is also home to a bar & grill restaurant and some other services.

Demographics

References

Census-designated places in Carbon County, Montana
Unincorporated communities in Montana
Billings metropolitan area
Census-designated places in Montana
Unincorporated communities in Carbon County, Montana